"Russian Spies" / "Occult Enemies" is a single from Against Me!, released as a 7" vinyl single on June 14, 2011 on Sabot Productions.

Background
After Against Me!'s break in late 2010, the band returned with a new drummer, Jay Weinberg. Laura Jane Grace said in early 2011 in many interviews that the band intended to release an EP or 7" before summer 2011, after "kicking around" a few songs that did not necessarily feel like tracks for a sixth studio album. Prior to their March 2011 tour with Dropkick Murphys, the band spent time off tour in Madison, Wisconsin recording at a studio owned by Butch Vig.

Track listing

Personnel

Band
 Laura Jane Grace – guitar, lead vocals
 James Bowman  – guitar, backing vocals
 Andrew Seward – bass guitar, backing vocals
 Jay Weinberg – drums

Production
 Mike Zirkel – recording engineer and mixing
 Rob Halstead – assistant engineer
 Emily Lazar and Joe LaPorta – mastering

Art and design
 Steak Mtn. – art direction, design, typography, and illustration
 Ryan Russell – band photography

See also
Against Me! discography

References

External links
 Recording two new songs at Smart Studios in Madison, WI., To clarify, full band is recording. Also recording a TV show theme song. Can't say which show yet, not sure if they're going use it. – Original announcement on Grace's Twitter

Songs about spies
Songs about Russia
2011 singles
Against Me! songs
Songs written by Laura Jane Grace